James Francis Kempster (15 October 1892 in County Dublin, Ireland – 21 April 1975 in County Dublin) was an Irish cricketer. A right-handed batsman and right-arm medium pace bowler, he played two first-class matches for the Ireland cricket team against Scotland in the 1920s, scoring a total of 55 runs in his four innings.

References

1892 births
1975 deaths
Irish cricketers
Cricketers from County Dublin